Gopal Singh may refer to:
Raja Gopal Singh, former Speaker of Rajasthan Legislative Assembly
Gopal Singh (politician) (1917–1990), Indian mystic, poet, writer and philosopher
Gopal Singh Rawat, Indian bureaucrat
Gopal Singh Khalsa, Indian freedom fighter and politician
Gopal Singh Chauhan, Indian politician, member of the Indian National Congress party
Gopal K. Singh (born 1976), Indian actor